Maritime Central Airways Flight 315 was an international charter flight from London, England to Toronto, Ontario, Canada, with refueling stops in Reykjavík, Iceland, and Goose Bay, Labrador. At the time, it was the deadliest aviation accident in Canadian history, and as of 2020 is still the fifth-deadliest. It is also the second-deadliest crash involving a DC-4, behind another in 1967.

Accident

Flight 315 departed London Heathrow International Airport for Reykjavík at 21:48 GMT.  Then, after stopping in Reykjavík for 66 minutes to refuel, it proceeded on the next leg of its route to Canada.  After entering Canadian airspace, the flight crew radioed that they wished to bypass Goose Bay and proceed to Montreal instead.  At 18:10, Quebec Radio Range Station relayed a message to the aircraft, requesting it to contact Montreal Range while approaching Rougemont for clearance.  This was the final communication with the aircraft prior to the accident.

While flying in the vicinity of Quebec City at an altitude of approx. 6,000 feet, Flight 315 flew into a cumulonimbus cloud.  Encountering severe turbulence, the aircraft somehow lost control and went into a near-vertical dive from which it could not recover.  At 18:15 UTC, at a speed of over 200 knots, the aircraft slammed into the ground near Issoudun in a 70-degree nose-down position and a slight left bank angle.  All 73 passengers and six crew were killed on impact.

References

1957 in Canada
Aviation accidents and incidents in 1957
Aviation accidents and incidents in Canada
Airliner accidents and incidents caused by weather
Accidents and incidents involving the Douglas DC-4
1957 in Quebec
August 1957 events in Canada